Gustavo Kuerten was the defending champion but lost in the second round to Lars Burgsmüller.

Mikhail Youzhny won in the final 6–3, 3–6, 3–6, 6–4, 6–4 against Guillermo Cañas.

Seeds
A champion seed is indicated in bold while text in italics indicates the round in which that seed was eliminated.

  Jiří Novák (semifinals)
  Gustavo Kuerten (second round)
  Guillermo Cañas (final)
  Younes El Aynaoui (quarterfinals)
  Andrei Pavel (quarterfinals)
  Nicolás Lapentti (second round)
  Rainer Schüttler (first round)
  Tommy Robredo (quarterfinals)

Draw

 NB: The Final was the best of 5 sets while all other rounds were the best of 3 sets.

Final

Section 1

Section 2

References
 2002 Mercedes Cup Draw

Singles 2002
Stuttgart Singles